Dongxiang is a district of Jiangxi province, People's Republic of China. It is under the jurisdiction of the prefecture-level city of Fuzhou.

Administrative divisions
In the present,Dongxiang District has 9 towns and 5 townships. 
9 towns

5 townships

Demographics

Climate

Transportation
Fuzhou East Railway Station is located on the northern outskirts of Dongxiang's county seat.

Notes and references

External links
 Government site - 

County-level divisions of Jiangxi
Fuzhou, Jiangxi